The Lake Isabella Historic Residential District is a U.S. historic district (designated as such on November 15, 1993) located in Lake City, Florida. The district is bounded by East, Duval and Columbia Streets, Baya Avenue, Church Street and Lake Isabella. It contains 145 historic buildings.

References

External links
 Columbia County listings at National Register of Historic Places

Geography of Columbia County, Florida
Historic districts on the National Register of Historic Places in Florida
Lake City, Florida
National Register of Historic Places in Columbia County, Florida